The Sheriff of Selkirk was historically a royal official responsible for enforcing justice in Selkirk, Scotland. Prior to 1748 most sheriffdoms were held on a hereditary basis. From that date, following the Jacobite uprising of 1745, the hereditary sheriffs were replaced by salaried sheriff-deputes, qualified advocates who were members of the Scottish Bar.

Following mergers of the Scottish sheriffdoms in 1868 the position became the Sheriff of Roxburgh and Selkirk.

Sheriffs of Selkirk

Andrew Sinton (c.1214)
Alexander Sinton (1265)
Andrew Sinton
Alexander Synton (-1293)
Andrew Synton (1293-)
Hugh of Eyland (1296)
Isabella Synton (1305)
Aymer de Valence, Earl of Pembroke (1306)
Edward Keith (1328)
Robert de Manners (1334)
William de Montacute (1335)
John Turnbull (1360)
John Turnbull (1364) - Deputy
Thomas Erskyne (1373)
Thomas Erskine (1469)
John Murray (1503)

Sheriffs-Depute
George Sinclair, Lord Woodall, –1751 
Andrew Pringle, 1751–1755 
Walter Scott, 1799–1832
Thomas Hamilton Miller, 1832–1844
George Dundas, 1844–>1861 

 For sheriffs after 1868 see Sheriff of Roxburgh and Selkirk.

See also
 Historical development of Scottish sheriffdoms

References

Sheriff courts
Selkirkshire

1868 disestablishments in Scotland